Oroville Municipal Airport  is a public airport located 3 miles (5 km) southwest of the city of Oroville in Butte County, California, United States.

Facilities 

 Runway 02/20: 6,020 x 100 ft (1,835 x 30 m), surface: asphalt
 Runway 13/31: 3,540 x 100 ft (1,079 x 30 m), surface: asphalt

The airport has two runways: Runway 02/20 (6,020 feet long by 100 feet wide) and Runway 13/31 (3,540 feet long by 100 feet wide). The runway system is anchored by three major parallel taxiways: 

 Taxiway A is a full-length  located on the east side of Runway 02/20.
 Taxiway J is a full-length  located on the west side of Runway 13/31.
 Taxiway R is a full-length  located on the east side of Runway 13/31.

Three main apron areas exist on the airfield. The largest is located around the Table Mountain Aviation FBO buildings. The FBO apron area is home to 38 tie-downs as well as the fuel tanks and provides access to Taxiway R to the west of the apron and Taxiway S to the north of the apron. The second largest apron area is located in the midfield area of the airfield, south of Runway 20. It is home to 76 tie downs. The third apron area is located east of the Table Mountain Golf Course, provides space for five tie downs, and is ideal for golfers that fly to the airport.

History
In 1936, the City of Oroville acquired  of grazing land for use as a municipal airport.

In 1942, the War Department leased the Oroville Municipal Airport and renamed it Oroville Army Air Field (AAF). That same year the Army purchased an additional  of land for expansion of the field and construction of a cantonment area. Once operational, it served as a fighter group training installation from spring of 1943 through early summer 1944. Two fighter groups rotated through Oroville AAF: the 357th Fighter Group (fighter group of famed pilots Chuck Yeager and Bud Anderson) and the 369th Fighter Group. Aircraft present at the field were identified as the Bell P-39Q Airacobra, North American P-51B/C/D Mustangs, and possibly the North American A-36 Apache, the ground attack version of the P-51.
 
Layout plans of the former Oroville AAF dated 1944 indicate a Bomb Storage Area west of the two runways and a skeet range between the southern extents of the runways. Fueling pit boxes were located along former Taxiways A (running parallel to runway 13/31) and C (connecting the southernmost ends of runways 02/20 and 13/31). A 1947 Inventory Report of Buildings and Structures states that bombs were stored in earth revetments.

In 1945 Oroville AAF was listed as “temporarily inactive” under assignment to Air Technical Service Command and was later classified as surplus. In 1946 the War Assets Administration (WAA) assumed custody of the site and on 21 May 1947, the WAA terminated the U.S. Army's lease with the City of Oroville and returned ownership to civil authorities.

Incidents
On August 21, 2019, a Cessna Citation Excel operated by Delta Private Jets bound for Portland International Airport suffered a runway excursion at the departure end of Runway 02 after an aborted takeoff. After all ten occupants (two crew, eight passengers) safely evacuated, the fire quickly engulfed the aircraft, permanently damaging it. The aircraft fire spawned a rapidly-spreading grassland fire during one of the most deadly fire seasons the area had experienced in decades, creating a moment of panic due to its close proximity to an industrial park and populated areas but luckily, it was contained within an hour.

Statistics 

For the year ending 31 December 2018, the airport had a total of 36,000 aircraft operations, which is an average of 99 movements per day; 56% general aviation (itinerant), 40% general aviation (local), and 4% air taxi.

During this time, 47 aircraft were listed with Oroville Muni as their home base: 44 single-engined aircraft, 1 helicopter, and 1 ultralight.

See also

 California World War II Army Airfields

References

External links 
 City of Oroville: Oroville Municipal Airport

Oroville, California
Airports in Butte County, California
Airfields of the United States Army Air Forces in California